In mathematics, the Gelfand–Zeitlin system (also written Gelfand–Zetlin system, Gelfand–Cetlin system, Gelfand–Tsetlin system) is an integrable system on conjugacy classes of Hermitian matrices.

References

External links 
http://ncatlab.org/nlab/show/Gelfand-Tsetlin+basis

Integrable systems